"Do It" is a song by American singer Toni Braxton. It was written by Braxton along with Percy Bady, Paul Boutin, and Antonio Dixon for her tenth studio album Spell My Name (2020), while production was helmed by Dixon. The R&B ballad was released as the album's first single on April 6, 2020, also serving as Braxton's debut with Island Records. It peaked at number 1 on the US Adult R&B Songs chart.

Background
"Do It" was written Braxton, Percy Bady, Paul Boutin, and Antonio Dixon. Due to the COVID-19 pandemic, Dixon had to do some of the final mixing sessions over Zoom due to the lockdown orders that were handed down in California in March 2020. In a press release, Braxton revealed that the song was initially written in 2019 when one of her friends was going through the struggles of trying to end a  bad relationship. The singer further commented: "We have all been through situations like this when there is really nothing more to say, you know he’s not right and you just need to do what you need to do. There is also an element of hope in the song, that after you do what you need to do things will get better.”

Critical reception
Christine Imarenezor from Vibe called "Do It" an encouraging ballad on which Braxton "sings over a piano and violin-assisted melody, while offering encouraging advice of letting go of unhealthy or toxic love." Rap-Up found that "the sultry track hits close to home for Braxton", while SoulTracks called the song a "forlorn ballad about a lover", adding that "when Toni Braxton is singing sad, she’s usually doing something special. And "Do It" feels just right." Elias Light from Rolling Stone found that the song was "glacial but sweeping, a slow-rolling ballad that practically commands a friend to leave a crumbling relationship."

Promotion
Two lyric videos for "Do It" premiered online during April 2020, one depicting a close-up performance from Braxton and the other of her lips mouthing the lyrics. A homemade, phone-shot performance for "Do It" was also released on her YouTube account, showing her lip-syncing the song in a lace bra.

Remixes

On May 8, 2020, Braxton's team released the Zac Samuel Remix of "Do It" to her YouTube account, a house-fused uptempo remix of the song that was provided by British DJ Zac Samuel. On June 26, 2020, Braxton released another official remix featuring rapper Missy Elliott, which was produced by Elliott along with PromoBoi and Hannon Lane. In a press statement that preceded its release, Elliott, who had never worked directly with Braxton before, commented: "Toni’s team reached out to my manager and asked if I could produce a remix for her next single. They said, ‘Hey if Missy wants to rap on it we would love that too.’ So they sent me the record and my boy Hannon and I, sped the track up to a mid-tempo and re-arranged the music.” Elliott's remix, along with Dixon's original version, was included on the standard version of parent album Spell My Name (2020).

Credits and personnel
Credits lifted from the single's liner notes.

 Percy Bady – keyboards, writing
 Paul Boutin – mixing, vocal production, writing
 Toni Braxon – vocals, vocal production, writing
 Antonio Dixon – keyboards, production, writing
 Demonte Posey – strings
 Herb Powers Jr. – mastering

Charts

Weekly charts

Year-end charts

Release history

References

2020 singles
2020 songs
2020s ballads
Toni Braxton songs
Island Records singles
Contemporary R&B ballads
Songs written by Antonio Dixon (songwriter)
Songs written by Toni Braxton